Spain national field hockey team may refer to:
 Spain men's national field hockey team
 Spain women's national field hockey team